Glinus is a genus of tropical and subtropical plants in the family Molluginaceae. Plants of this genus are sometimes called sweetjuice. They are squat annual herbs with fuzzy to hairy green herbage. The fruit is a capsule containing many kidney-shaped seeds. Some species are used as herbal remedies and some are eaten as food.

Selected species
Glinus herniarioides
Glinus lotoides
Glinus oppositifolius
Glinus radiatus

External links
Jepson Manual Treatment

Molluginaceae
Caryophyllales genera